The Fife derby is a football rivalry that is based in Fife, Scotland. Matches are contested between any two SPFL clubs from Dunfermline Athletic, Raith Rovers (based in Kirkcaldy), East Fife (representing the Levenmouth area) and Cowdenbeath. As of 2021, a fifth Fife side, Kelty Hearts, entered the SPFL.

Overview
The two best-supported clubs in the region are Dunfermline and Raith Rovers, and in general their meetings attract the most interest, however any match between the five clubs is referred to as a 'Fife derby'. A sixth local club, Lochgelly United, competed in the Scottish Football League for five seasons (1921 to 1926).

None of the clubs have won the Scottish League title or finished runners-up. Aside from Kelty Hearts, all have played in the top division at one point in their history (although never all at the same time). East Fife were Scottish League Cup winners three times in six years between 1947 and 1953, while Dunfermline won the Scottish Cup twice in the 1960s; The only occasion when two clubs from the region met in a major cup final was in October 1949, when East Fife defeated Dunfermline 3–0 at Hampden Park to win the 1949–50 League Cup; the crowd of 39,744 is a record for a Fife derby match.

Raith Rovers are the only Fife team to have won the Scottish Challenge Cup, achieving this in both 2022 and most notably 2014 with a win over Rangers. Perhaps the most important Fife derby meeting of the early 21st century came a month after the Raith cup win, when Cowdenbeath overcame Dunfermline 4–1 on aggregate in the 2013–14 Championship play-off final to preserve their status in Scotland's second tier at their neighbours' expense.

Dunfermline Athletic had their first sellout crowd in 15 years for a Fife derby played against First Division title rivals Raith Rovers in April 2011. East Fife's record attendance at their old Bayview Park ground was also against Raith, attracting a 22,515 crowd in 1950.

Senior non-league and Juniors
Prior to 2017, most of the Fife clubs outwith the SPFL played in the Junior setup's East Region, with both Kelty Hearts and Tayport having won the East Superleague on two occasions. Burntisland Shipyard were the sole senior team, playing in the East of Scotland Football League.

In 2017 Kelty left the Juniors and joined the East of Scotland League (which is part of the senior pyramid) with the aim of rising through the divisions and becoming an SPFL club.  A year later several other teams from Fife followed suit, including Kelty's local rivals Hill of Beath Hawthorn, plus Crossgates Primrose, Dundonald Bluebell, Inverkeithing Hillfield Swifts, Oakley United, and St Andrews United, with Glenrothes following a year later.

Meanwhile, Kelty were successful in achieving their ambition. In 2018 they were promoted to the Lowland Football League, and were subsequently promoted to the SPFL in 2021, becoming the fifth Fife club in the league.

With the exception of Tayport who compete against teams in the Tayside area due to their proximity to Dundee, the remainder of the Fife Junior clubs—Kennoway Star Hearts, Kirkcaldy & Dysart, Lochgelly Albert, Lochore Welfare, Newburgh, Rosyth, and Thornton Hibs—moved across to the East of Scotland League for the 2020–21 season.

Results tables

Dunfermline v Raith Rovers

First meeting: 7 September 1889, 1889–90 Scottish Cup
Next meeting: To be confirmed.

As of: 6 April 2022.

Dunfermline v East Fife

First meeting: 24 September 1921, 1921–22 Scottish Division Two
Next meeting: To be confirmed.

As of: 9 July 2022.

East Fife v Raith Rovers

First meeting: 21 August 1926, 1926–27 Scottish Division Two
Next meeting: To be confirmed.

As of: 9 October 2021.

Cowdenbeath v Dunfermline

First meeting: 22 August 1888, 1888–89 Scottish Cup
Next meeting: To be confirmed.

As of: end of 2017–18 season.

Cowdenbeath v East Fife

First meeting: 16 November 1921, 1921–22 Scottish Division Two
Next meeting: To be confirmed.

As of: 10 October 2020.

Cowdenbeath v Raith Rovers

First meeting: 14 October 1905, 1905–06 Scottish Division Two
Next meeting: To be confirmed.

As of: 10 July 2021.

Totals for four clubs
As of: 9 July 2022.

Notes

Kelty Hearts 
Upon being promoted to the SPFL in 2021, Kelty Hearts became the fifth member from the Kingdom of Fife. Playing in the 2021–22 Scottish League Two, they will play against Cowdenbeath, with the two teams separated by just 2.7 miles.

Achievements by Fife clubs
Up to and including season 2017–18.

References

External links
 1949 League Cup Final Video highlights from official Pathé News archive

Scotland football derbies
Football in Fife
Dunfermline Athletic F.C.
Raith Rovers F.C.
East Fife F.C.
Cowdenbeath F.C.
Recurring sporting events established in 1888